This is a list of active weapons of the Turkish Air Force that are currently in service.

Current weapons

Air Defense Weapons

Missiles and bombs

Small arms and Light weapons

References

Air Force
Weapons,Modern
Turkish Air Force,Modern